José Alfredo Saavedra (born December 4, 1964) is a Honduran Liberal Party politician and was head of the National Congress of Honduras from June 28, 2009 to January 25, 2010, a position he took from Roberto Micheletti when the 2009 Honduran constitutional crisis saw the forced removal of Manuel Zelaya from being President of Honduras.

References

1964 births
Living people
Presidents of the National Congress of Honduras
Liberal Party of Honduras politicians